Jowr Sara (also Romanized as Jowr Sarā) is a village in Bibalan Rural District, Kelachay District, Rudsar County, Gilan Province, Iran. At the 2006 census, its population was 49, in 10 families.

References 

Populated places in Rudsar County